Saint-Hippolyte-le-Graveyron (Provençal: Sant Ipolite lo Graveiron) is a commune in the Vaucluse department in the Provence-Alpes-Côte d'Azur region in southeastern France.

Sites and Monuments

Stone column topped by an iron cross.
Chateau Juvenal 19th century
Parish church, built in 1830, land donated by a former mayor Hypolite Fabre.

See also
Communes of the Vaucluse department

References

Communes of Vaucluse